The Hoyerswerda riots were xenophobic riots that lasted from 17 to 23 September 1991 in Hoyerswerda, a town in the north-east of Saxony, Germany.

The riots started with a group of mainly young neo-Nazis attacking Vietnamese street hawkers. After the intervention of the police, a hostel used mainly by Mozambican contract workers came under attack. In the following night, further riots took place in Hoyerswerda and foreigners were hurt. On the fourth night, stones and petrol bombs were thrown at an apartment block in Thomas-Müntzer-Straße that housed asylum seekers. During the clashes, 32 people were hurt and 83 were arrested.

After the incidents, the Saxony government evacuated the asylum seekers from Thomas-Müntzer-Straße and many contract workers left the town. In 1991, the word ausländerfrei (free of foreigners) became a synonym for the riot and the 'un-word of the year' in Germany 1991.

The city made efforts to polish its public image and to take action against right-wing radicals. Although the presence of right-wing radicals in the city is less visible, it is still a centre of right-wing extremism. In 2006, the Jungen Nationaldemokraten, the youth organisation of the far-right National Democratic Party of Germany, organised a demonstration to remember the 1991 riots. The police arrested over 50 counter-demonstrators and the demonstration took place.

See also
 Riot of Rostock-Lichtenhagen
 Solingen arson attack of 1993

References

External links
 Time Magazine article of 14 October 1991

Anti-Asian sentiment in Europe
Anti-Vietnamese sentiment
Ethnic riots
Riots and civil disorder in Germany
Hoyerswerda
1991 in Germany
Protests in Germany
Neo-Nazi attacks in Germany
1990s in Saxony
September 1991 events in Europe